The Girl Who Wouldn't Work is an extant 1925 American silent drama film produced by B. P. Schulberg and starring Lionel Barrymore and Marguerite De La Motte. Preferred Pictures and Al Lichtman handled the distribution of this film directed by Marcel De Sano.<ref>The American Film Institute Catalog Feature Films: 1921-30 by The American Film Institute, c.1971</ref>

Plot
As described in a film magazine reviews, Mary Hale, employed in a department store, arouses the displeasure of her boss because she shirks her work. Gordon Kent, a rounder, is turned down by another clerk, and flirts with Mary and she loses her job. To spite her fiancé, William Norworth, the assistant manager, she drives away in Kent’s automobile. They land at her home early in the morning just as her father, a night watchman, is returning home. He scolds and slaps her and, when she meets Kent the next day, she tells him that she has left home. He persuades her to come to his home for the night and he goes to the club. Greta, a chorus girl who is his mistress, comes to the house and kicks Mary out. Mary’s father also appears on the scene, mistakes Greta, who has hidden in bed, for Mary and shoots her dead. The next morning Kent discovers the tragedy, blames himself for it, and confesses the crime to save Mary’s reputation. Her father, however, finally confesses.

Cast

Preservation
A print of The Girl Who Wouldn't Work'' is preserved at the Library of Congress.

See also
Honor killing
Lionel Barrymore filmography

References

External links

Lobby poster (if page doesn't download simply click-> the worthpoint link then return and click)

1925 films
American silent feature films
Films based on British novels
1925 drama films
Silent American drama films
American black-and-white films
Films directed by Marcel De Sano
Preferred Pictures films
1920s American films